Mohamed Bachtobji (Arabic: محمد الباش طبجي; born 1 April 1980) is a French former professional footballer who played as a defender.

References

External links
 
 

1980 births
Living people
French footballers
Association football defenders
Tunisian Ligue Professionnelle 1 players
Jura Dolois Football players
AS Nancy Lorraine players
FC 08 Homburg players
Louhans-Cuiseaux FC players
Olympique Noisy-le-Sec players
ES Zarzis players
Club Africain players
Espérance Sportive de Tunis players
People from Dole, Jura
Sportspeople from Jura (department)
Footballers from Bourgogne-Franche-Comté
Expatriate footballers in Tunisia
Expatriate footballers in Germany
French expatriate sportspeople in Tunisia
French expatriate sportspeople in Germany
French expatriate footballers